Will Purvis {1872-1938} was a member of the White Caps, a group with foundations similar to the Ku Klux Klan. He was convicted of the murder of Will Buckley in 1894 and always maintained his innocence. He scornfully told the jury he would "live longer than the lot of them". He was sentenced to death by hanging, but survived because the noose loosened around his neck. He was imprisoned, pardoned and eventually released. 

Although he was free, he continued to maintain that he had been wrongly convicted. In 1917, Purvis' innocence was finally proven. On his deathbed, another man, Joe Beard, confessed that he had been involved in the ambush and identified the killer as Louis Thornhill. Louis Thornhill was never brought to trial. He had died years prior. Mississippi's law also required the signature of witnesses and a signed copy of the deathbed confession. Since there was no written acknowledgement of the confession, the perpetrator could not be prosecuted.

Because of Beards’ confession, Will Purvis was given $5000.00 in restitution by the Mississippi Legislature for having been wrongfully convicted and imprisoned. 

William Isaac Purvis died in Purvis, Mississippi, on October 13, 1938, three days after the last juror had died. He was 66 years old.

External links

Will Purvis at Find A Grave
 The Miracle on the Gallows

American people convicted of murder
American prisoners sentenced to death
1872 births
1938 deaths